Salas Obasi Okechukwu (born 15 May 1989) is a Nigerian professional footballer who currently plays as a winger for Bulgarian Third league club Levski Chepintsi.

Career
In February 2008 Okechukwu joined Bulgarian third division side Chepinets Velingrad.

On 23 October 2010 Okechukwu joined Oborishte Panagyurishte in fourth division. On 18 June 2011 he scored goal and provided assist in the play-off for promotion to the Bulgarian V AFG, which helped Oborishte to a 4-0 victory over Rilski Sportist Samokov.

After visiting Minyor Pernik on trial in June 2011, he signed his first professional contract with the club on 22 July. Okechukwu made his A PFG debut on 6 August in a 1–0 home win over Vidima-Rakovski, coming on as a substitute for Farès Brahimi.

In February 2018, Okechukwu was loaned from Tsarsko Selo to Bulgarian Second League rivals Strumska Slava.  He returned to his parent club at the end of the season.

Career statistics

References

External links

Profile at sportal.bg

1989 births
Living people
Nigerian footballers
Association football midfielders
PFC Minyor Pernik players
FC Oborishte players
FC Tsarsko Selo Sofia players
FC Strumska Slava Radomir players
First Professional Football League (Bulgaria) players
Second Professional Football League (Bulgaria) players
Expatriate footballers in Bulgaria
Nigerian expatriate footballers
Nigerian expatriate sportspeople in Bulgaria